Block Z is a 2020 Philippine zombie thriller film directed by Mikhail Red and starring Joshua Garcia, Julia Barretto, Dimples Romana, Yves Flores, Myrtle Sarrosa, Maris Racal, McCoy de Leon, Ian Veneracion, and Ina Raymundo. It follows a group of university students who try to survive the undead during a deadly viral outbreak. The film was theatrically released on January 29, 2020.

Plot
Mario brings his daughter PJ, a medical student, to her first day of senior year at San Lazaro University. Due to his previous work as an OFW and his inability to pay his daughter's tuition, Mario has a strained relationship with PJ, who is still traumatized from failing to save her mother from a fatal stroke. She reunites with her block mates in Block Z: fellow med students and longtime friends Erika and Myles, and Block Z basketball team captain Lucas, who harbors feelings for PJ. Mario accidentally hits a pedestrian who  intends to scam him, but Mario instead brings the man to the university hospital, where he meets with PJ again.

PJ and Erika are assigned to take care of Angie, a mother who appears to have a human bite in her leg. Angie suddenly has a seizure and dies shortly after, and PJ goes to comfort Angie's young daughter Ruby. Myles and fellow student Gary head over to bring Angie's body to the morgue, but Angie reanimates and bites Gary's neck, causing Myles to flee. Angie begins attacking other people in the hospital, causing them to be infected and reanimate as undead, forcing Mario and the pedestrian to flee together. The undead infect students and personnel on campus, including Lucas' team where he emerges as the only survivor. Lucas meets Mario and the pedestrian, but the latter is bitten and turned, forcing the two to kill him. The two then separate, both intending to find PJ. Student council president Gelo calls his father, a general, for evacuation via helicopter on the hospital's helipad and tells his vice president Vanessa not to tell anyone else. Despite this, Vanessa secretly informs the university councilors. Lucas manages to find PJ with Erika and Myles and the four work together to flee the school. The military quarantines the university, and shoots both zombies and students fleeing from the front gate.

Gelo confronts Vanessa for telling the university body about the helicopter, and Vanessa chastises him for his selfishness. Aftet a scuffle, Gelo accidentally pushes Vanessa off a staircase, killing her; when PJ's group stumbles upon the scene, Gelo says she was killed in self-defense after being infected, and he joins the group. The group go to the hospital, but are overwhelmed with zombies before being rescued by Mario in the school's church, where he has managed to hole up with Ruby and security guard Bebeth. Gelo reveals that people have to be left behind as his helicopter can only fit two people, which angers the others in the process before the group convinces him that he needs them to survive.

The group passes by the faculty rooms, but when Ruby sees her infected mother, she rushes to her and alerts the herd to their location. Ruby is devoured in the process, and the others are forced to leave when Gelo goes to the faculty building and locks them out. The group rests in the dormitory, where they reminisce on their past and PJ and Mario reconcile, but a zombie attacks and bites Mario before it is killed. Mario tells the group to kill him to prevent him from turning, but the group opts to lock him inside the dorm's closet, and he says his final goodbyes to PJ before they leave. The group discovers the zombies' weaknesses to headshots and water, but Myles is mortally wounded by a stray zombie and makes a last stand before he is killed. Bebeth stays behind fending off zombies from the others, and Erika sacrifices herself to let PJ and Lucas escape. The two reach the hospital's rooftop, where Lucas lifts PJ to the helipad before using himself as bait to lure zombies away by jumping off the building.

A sorrowful PJ loses consciousness and awakens the next day with no helicopter in sight. She sees that she has a bite mark in her hand and realizes that she is immune to the virus. She fights her way back to the dormitory, killing several zombies including Angie in the process. PJ reunites with Mario, who is also immune, and the two explore an ancient tunnel underneath the church that Ruby had previously discovered. There, they encounter Gelo, who is delirious from being infected and jaded from being abandoned by his father. The two evade him and escape through a manhole, leaving  Gelo to be devoured by approaching zombies. PJ and Mario realize that the infection has spread into the wider city, and they arm themselves.

News reports begin sharing the zombie's vulnerability to water. Bebeth broadcasts a message that she had survived. A large typhoon arrives, weakening and killing many of the undead in the process. Two weeks later, a group of survivors discover a badly-injured Lucas, who is taken in by their leader.

Cast
Joshua Garcia as Lucas, a varsity basketball team captain in San Lazaro and PJ’s love interest  
Julia Barretto as Princess Joy “PJ”, a medical student from San Lazaro University and Lucas’ love interest
Ian Veneracion as Mario, PJ's doting father
Maris Racal as Erika, PJ's best friend
McCoy de Leon as Myles, a medical student who is friends with PJ, Erika, and Lucas
Yves Flores as Gelo, the student council president and son of a prominent corrupt general 
Ina Raymundo as Angie, a mother who becomes patient zero of the outbreak within the university 
Dimples Romana as Bebeth, a guard at San Lazaro University
Myrtle Sarrosa as Vanessa, the social media-savvy vice president of the school's student council
Angel Locsin (cameo role) as the unnamed leader of a group of raiders

Production
Block Z marked the sixth feature film and second studio film for director Mikhail Red, following Rekorder (2013), Birdshot (2016), Neomanila (2017), Eerie (2019), and Dead Kids (2019). The film is also said to be Red's "most ambitious project yet". Filming began in March 2019, and ended in July 2019. Shooting took place in Manila and Quezon City.

According to Red, the film featured fast-running zombies in the same vein as in 28 Days Later.

Marketing
The teaser trailer was released on July 5, 2019, on YouTube. The full trailer was released on December 31, 2019, on Youtube.

Release
The film was theatrically released on January 29, 2020.

Television release

Pay-per-view
The film premiered on KBO from April 3–7, 2020, as part of "Star Cinema Movies Now Na!" promotion (along with James and Pat and Dave on the same channel from April 9–14, 2020), two months after its theatrical release.

Cable television
The film premiered on movie channel, Cinema One on July 5, 2020, five days after ABS-CBN TV Plus and Sky Direct channels temporarily ceased operations due to the alias cease and desist order by the National Telecommunications Commission due to expiration of franchises of ABS-CBN and Sky Cable last May 4, 2020. The film also premiered on Kapamilya Channel on October 3, 2020.

Free-to-air
The film premiered on A2Z Channel 11 on November 7, 2020.

References

External links

2020 films
Films about viral outbreaks
Filipino zombie films
Films shot in Manila
Philippine horror films
Star Cinema films
Films about father–daughter relationships
2020s survival films
Apocalyptic films
Films directed by Mikhail Red